Peirana was a town of ancient Lycia, which according to Pindar was the home of Bellerophon.

Its site is unlocated.

References

Populated places in ancient Lycia
Former populated places in Turkey
Lost ancient cities and towns
Locations in Greek mythology